Seaside Park (commonly known as the Ventura County Fairgrounds) is an event venue in Ventura, California, United States. The  is the home of the Ventura County Fair. Trade shows, concerts, and other events are held throughout the year at the fairgrounds. The beachfront site, near the mouth of the Ventura River, also includes Surfers' Point, known for its point break that produces distinctive waves.

The original  were donated to the County of Ventura by Eugene Preston Foster and Orpha Foster, who envisioned the Seaside Park as a miniature Golden Gate Park. The Fosters wanted a beautiful gateway to Ventura, where families could walk and picnic, play tennis, and enjoy family outings. Most of the site is now owned by the State of California and is managed by the 31st District Agricultural Association, an independent state agency.

Events and activities

Fairgrounds

The 31st District Agricultural Association is a state special-purpose district in the Division of Fairs and Expositions of the California Department of Food and Agriculture. The Fair Board's role is to set and approve policies for the organization. Members of the Board of Directors are appointed by the governor of California. They organize the annual Ventura County Fair and run the Derby Club, a live via satellite horse racing off-track wagering facility.

Events are held throughout the year, including trade shows, conventions, concerts, and festivals. The year-round facility has convention facilities, demonstration halls, equestrian facilities which include an  arena, and administrative offices. Although the original race track and grandstand are long gone, the Ventura Raceway is hosted at the fairgrounds when the fair is not in season.

The Thousand Oaks shooting at the Borderline dance bar in November 2018 was a month before the last gun show of the year at the fairgrounds. While considering the 2019 season, the board fair only approved the first two guns shows of the new year with the desire to prepare a policy before approving the three additional gun shows requested by the company that puts on them on. A state law prohibited the sale of firearms and ammunition after January 1, 2023.

Public recreation

The Omer Rains Bike Trail lies outside the fairgrounds fence running along the beach and river levee. Connecting the San Buenaventura State Beach to the south and Emma Wood State Beach to the north, the path is on the Pacific Coast Bicycle Route and also serves as an access point for California Coastal Trail. Surfing is popular here with its point break that produces distinctive waves.

History
Eugene P. and Orpha Foster envisioned a miniature Golden Gate Park since John McLaren, the designer of that park, was a family friend. They donated the original  to the County of Ventura, adding another  later. They wanted a beautiful gateway to Ventura, where families could walk and picnic, play tennis, and enjoy family outings.

Historical uses

The locomotive, which Coit had designed, was of the camelback type. After a short period of time, he relocated some of the equipment to the Long Beach and Asbury Park Railway.

For many years, Babe Ruth Field occupied the area of the main parking lot and served as the home of the Ventura Braves, Ventura Yankees, and Ventura Oilers professional baseball teams.

Modern projects
The bike path along the shore was refurbished in 1989. Within a couple of years that path was again eaten by waves and began to fail. Initially, fair officials wanted a buried sea wall to protect the bike path that had been damaged. Surfers fiercely objected, fearing that this would destroy the point break near the Ventura River that generates the distinctive waves at Surfers' Point at Seaside Park, the city park area. Environmentalists projected reduced habitat and increased erosion rates on nearby beaches by the altered wave patterns. In 2011, the popular bike and pedestrian path was moved inland as part of a managed retreat project, a first of its kind in California. During the 2022-2033 storms with big swells, the project area responded really well with no damage to the dunes.

In popular culture
In 1922, a horse race was filmed here for The Pride of Palomar, a movie bankrolled by newspaper magnate William Randolph Hearst's Cosmopolitan Pictures.

In 1927, Racing Romeo, a saga about a young race car driver starring football great Red Grange, used the fairground track.

See also
Billy Jones Wildcat Railroad 
Eastlake Park Scenic Railway
Long Beach and Asbury Park Railway
Venice Miniature Railway
Urbita Lake Railway

References

Beaches of Southern California
Buildings and structures in Ventura, California
Fairgrounds in California
Music venues in California
Parks in Ventura County, California
Surfing locations in California
Beaches of Ventura County, California
14½ in gauge railways
Managed retreat